"The Form of the Sword" (original Spanish title: "La forma de la espada", sometimes translated as "The Shape of the Sword") is a short story by Argentinian author Jorge Luis Borges, first published in July 1942 in La Nación, and included in the 1944 collection Ficciones, part two (Artifices). The first English translation appeared in New World Writing No. 4, in 1953. In the story, an Irishman, now living near Tacuarembó in Uruguay, recounts his experiences in the Irish War of Independence and how he received the large scar on his face.

Synopsis
Borges starts the story narrating as himself as he is forced to stop in a small town run by the unnamed Irishman, who is known as strict but fair. Borges ingratiates himself with the Irishman, and they go out to drink together on the patio. Borges gets drunk and asks about the origin of a crescent-shaped scar on the Irishman's face. His story is as follows:

The Irishman describes the war and the introduction of a new comrade, John Vincent Moon, into their band of rebels. He explains that the new comrade was a coward and was arrogant about his mental capabilities but terrified of being hurt. He describes how he himself saved Moon's life when soldiers attacked them. A bullet scraped Moon in the shoulder as they escaped, but the wound was only superficial.

He and Moon fled together to a general's house, where they stayed for ten days. The ninth day, he went out to avenge the death of some comrades. Moon always stayed at the house, pleading his injury. When the Irishman returned on their last day in the house, he heard Moon on the telephone, selling him to the police.

The Irishman recounts how he chased Moon, cornered him and marked a moon-shaped scar on his forehead just before the police captured him. At this point, Borges interrupts the story here to ask what happened to Moon.

The Irishman tells Borges he only is telling him the rest of this story because he is a stranger, because his disdain will not hurt so much. Then he proceeds to reveal that Moon fled with "Judas' money" while his comrade (apparently) was killed.

His story ends with the line: "I denounced the man who protected me: I am Vincent Moon. Now despise me."

References

Short stories by Jorge Luis Borges
1942 short stories